William Isaac Robinson (August 21, 1975 – March 29, 2020) was an American attorney and politician who served in the Michigan House of Representatives as a member of the Democratic Party from 2019 to 2020.

Early life and education
William Isaac Robinson was born on August 21, 1975 in Lansing, Michigan to Rose Mary Robinson, an activist and politician. In 1998, Robinson earned a Bachelor of General Studies from the University of Michigan and Juris Doctor from the Northwestern University Pritzker School of Law in 2001.

Career
Robinson became a law clerk for United Automobile Workers. In 2003, Robinson became a political director of Michigan Teamsters Joint Council #43 until 2010. In 2012, Robinson started his own law firm.

Politics

Robinson's mother represented the 4th district in the Michigan House of Representatives from 2013 to 2019. After his mother was prohibited from seeking a fourth term due to term limits, Isaac was part of a crowded field in the Democratic primary to replace her. He won the Democratic primary against thirteen other candidates and easily won in the Democratic-majority district in the general election.

In February 2020, he endorsed Senator Bernie Sanders for the Democratic presidential nomination for the 2020 presidential election. Robinson also served as vice chair for Sanders' Michigan campaign in the Democratic primary. He was a member of the Detroit chapter of the Democratic Socialists of America.

While in the House of Representatives, Robinson served on the Tax Policy, Commerce and Tourism, and Regulatory Reform committees. During the COVID-19 pandemic Robinson supported legislation that would temporarily suspend evictions, foreclosures, and shutting off utilities for ninety days and drafted legislation that would have removed waiting periods for unemployment benefits.

Death
On March 29, 2020, Robinson was taken to Detroit Receiving Hospital due to breathing problems and later died. Robinson's death is suspected of being caused by COVID-19 infection. He was 44 years old. Following his death, he was praised by Governor Gretchen Whitmer, Michigan State Attorney General Dana Nessel, Michigan House Speaker Lee Chatfield, Michigan House Minority Leader Christine Greig, and Congresswoman Rashida Tlaib.

Robinson was succeeded as representative by Abraham Aiyash.

Electoral history

See also
List of Democratic Socialists of America who have held office in the United States

References

External links
 Isaac Robinson at housedems.com 
 Isaac Robinson at ballotpedia.org

1975 births
2020 deaths
21st-century American lawyers
21st-century American politicians
Deaths from the COVID-19 pandemic in Michigan
Democratic Socialists of America politicians from Michigan
Democratic Party members of the Michigan House of Representatives
Michigan lawyers
Northwestern University Pritzker School of Law alumni
Place of birth missing
Politicians from Detroit
Politicians from Lansing, Michigan
University of Michigan alumni